The Soviet calendar was a modified Gregorian calendar that was used in Soviet Russia between 1918 and 1940. Several variations were used during that time. 

During the summer of 1929, five-day continuous work weeks were implemented in factories, government offices, and commercial enterprises, but not collective farms. One of the five days was randomly assigned to each worker as their day of rest, without regard to the rest days assigned to their family members or friends. These five-day work weeks continued throughout the Gregorian year, interrupted only by the five national holidays. While the five-day week was used for scheduling work, the Gregorian calendar and its seven-day week were used for all other purposes.

During the summer of 1931, six-day interrupted work weeks were implemented for most workers, with a common day of rest for all workers interrupting their work weeks. Five six-day work weeks were assigned to each Gregorian month, more or less, with the five national holidays converting normal work days into days of rest. On  five- and six-day work weeks were abandoned in favor of seven-day work weeks.

History

Gregorian calendar 

The decree required that the Julian date was to be written in parentheses after the Gregorian date until  All surviving examples of physical calendars from  show the irregular month lengths of the Gregorian calendar (such as those displayed here). Most calendars displayed all the days of a Gregorian year as a grid with seven rows or columns for the traditional seven-day week with Sunday (Воскресенье; "Resurrection") first.

The 1931 pocket calendar displayed here is a rare example that excluded the five national holidays, enabling the remaining 360 days of the Gregorian year to be displayed as a grid with five rows labeled  for each day of the five-day week. Even it had the full Gregorian calendar on the other side.

Work weeks

During the second half of May 1929, Yuri Larin (Юрий Ларин, 1882–1932) proposed a continuous production week (nepreryvnaya rabochaya nedelya = nepreryvka) to the Fifth Congress of Soviets of the Union, but so little attention was paid to his suggestion that the president of the Congress did not even mention it in his final speech. The change was advantageous to the anti-religious movement, as Sundays and religious holidays became working days. On  the Supreme Economic Council of the RSFSR directed its efficiency experts to submit within two weeks a plan to introduce continuous production. On  the Council of People's Commissars (CPC) of the Soviet Union (Sovnarkom) declared "it is essential that the systematically prepared transition of undertakings and institutions to continuous production should begin during the economic year ". The lengths of continuous production weeks were not yet specified, and the conversion was only to begin during the year. But many other lengths of continuous work weeks were used, all of which were gradually introduced.

Implementation of continuous production weeks 
On  building construction and seasonal trades were put on a continuous six-day week, while factories that regularly halted production every month for maintenance were put on six- or seven-day continuous production weeks. In , it was reported that about 50 different versions of the continuous work week were in use, the longest being a 'week' of 37 days (30 continuous days of work followed by seven days of rest). In  it was decreed that the conversion of all industries was to be completed during the economic year , except for the textile industry. But on  peak usage was reached, with 72.9% of industrial workers on continuous schedules. Thereafter, usage decreased. All of these official figures were somewhat inflated because some factories said they adopted the continuous week without actually doing so. The continuous week was applied to retail and government workers as well, but no usage figures were ever published.

The continuous week began as a five-day cycle, with each day color-coded and marked with a symbol. The population would be carved up into as many groups, each with its own rest day. These circles indicated when you worked and when you rested.

Implementation of six-day weeks 
As early as May 1930, while usage of the continuous week was still advancing, some factories reverted to an interrupted week. On , one of the largest factories in the Soviet Union was put on an interrupted six-day week (Шестидневка = shestidnevka). On , Stalin condemned the continuous work week as then practiced, supporting the temporary use of the interrupted six-day week (one common rest day for all workers) until the problems with the continuous work week could be resolved. During , most factories were put on an interrupted six-day week as the result of an interview with the People's Commissar for Labor, who severely restricted the use of the continuous week. Institutions serving cultural and social needs and those enterprises engaged in continuous production such as ore smelting were exempted. It is often stated that the effective date of the interrupted six-day work week was  but that is only the first whole month after the 'official conversion'. The massive summer 1931 conversion made this date after-the-fact and some industries continued to use continuous weeks. The last figures available indicate that on  74.2% of all industrial workers were on non-continuous schedules (almost all six-day weeks) while 25.8% were still on continuous schedules.

Five-day weeks

Each day of the five-day week was labeled by either one of five colors or a Roman numeral from I to V. Each worker was assigned a color or number to identify his or her day of rest.

Eighty percent of each factory's workforce was at work every day (except holidays) in an attempt to increase production while 20% were resting. But if a husband and wife, and their relatives and friends, were assigned different colors or numbers, they would not have a common rest day for their family and social life. Furthermore, machines broke down more frequently both because they were used by workers not familiar with them, and because no maintenance could be performed on machines that were never idle in factories with continuous schedules (24 hours/day every day). Five-day weeks (and later six-day weeks) "made it impossible to observe Sunday as a day of rest. This measure was deliberately introduced 'to facilitate the struggle to eliminate religion'".

The colors vary depending on the source consulted. The 1930 color calendar displayed here has days of purple, blue, yellow, red, and green, in that order beginning . Blue was supported by an anonymous writer in 1936 as the second day of the week, but he stated that red was the first day of the week. However, most sources replace blue with either   or peach, all of which specify the different order yellow, pink/orange/peach, red, purple, and green.

Six-day weeks 
 

From the summer of 1931 until Wednesday , each Gregorian month was divided into five six-day weeks, more or less (as shown by the 1933 and 1939 calendars here). The sixth day of each week, that is days 6, 12, 18, 24, and 30 of the month, was a uniform day off for all workers. The last day of 31-day months was always an extra work day in factories, which combined with the first five days of the following month made six successive work days. But some commercial and government offices treated the 31st day as an extra day off. The national holidays did not change, but they now converted five regular work days into holidays within three six-day weeks (none of these was on a free day, with a date divisible by 6), so May and November had just three days of work after three consecutive days off, unlike the earlier five-day week when the holidays "delayed the rotation" of colors and were inserted as an extra day splitting the four-day working period into two parts (or creating a longer break between two four-days of work for people whose standard day off was just before or after the holiday).

National holidays 
On 10 December 1918 six Bolshevik holidays were decreed during which work was prohibited.
 1 January – New Year's Day
 22 January – Day of 9 January 1905
 Commemorates Bloody Sunday on 9 January 1905 (Julian) or 22 January 1905 (Gregorian)
 12 March – Day of the Overthrow of the Autocracy
 18 March – Day of the Paris Commune
 1 May – Day of the International
 Celebration within Russia and later the Soviet Union of International Workers' Day
 7 November – Day of the Proletarian Revolution
 Commemorates the Bolshevik uprising on 25 October 1917 (Julian) or 7 November 1917 (Gregorian)

Although other events were commemorated on other dates, they were not days of rest. Originally, the "May holidays" and "November holidays" were one day each ( and ), but both were extended from one to two days in 1928, making  and  public holidays as well.

Until 1929, regional labor union councils or local governments were authorized to set up additional public holidays, totaling to up to 10 days a year. Although people would not work on those days, they would not be paid holidays. Typically, at least some of these days were used for religious feast, typically those of the Russian Orthodox Church, but in some localities possibly those of other religions as well.

The resulting five holidays continued to be celebrated until 1951, when  ceased to be a holiday. See История праздников России (History of the festivals of Russia).
 22 January – Day of Remembrance of 9 January 1905 and of the Memory of V.I. Lenin
 1–2 May – Days of the International
 7–8 November – Days of the Anniversary of the October Revolution

Erroneous reporting of "30-day months" 
Many sources erroneously state that both five- and six-day work weeks were collected into 30-day months.

A 1929 Time magazine article reporting Soviet five-day work weeks, which it called an "Eternal calendar", associated them with the French Republican Calendar, which had months containing three ten-day weeks. In  a government commission proposed a "Soviet revolutionary calendar" containing twelve 30-day months plus five national holidays that were not part of any month, but it was rejected because it would differ from the Gregorian calendar used by the rest of Europe. Four Journal of Calendar Reform articles (1938, 1940, 1943, 1954) thought that five-day weeks actually were collected into  months, as do several modern sources.

A 1931 Time magazine article reporting six-day weeks stated that they too were collected into 30-day months, with the five national holidays between those months. Two of the Journal of Calendar Reform articles (1938 and 1943) thought that six-day as well as five-day weeks were collected into 30-day months. A couple of modern sources state that five-day weeks plus the first two years of six-day weeks were collected into 30-day months.

Throughout this period, Pravda, the official newspaper of the Communist Party, and other newspapers continued to use Gregorian calendar dates in their mastheads alongside the traditional seven-day week. The traditional names of "Resurrection" (Воскресенье) for Sunday and "Sabbath" (Суббота) for Saturday continued to be used, despite the government's officially anti-religious atheistic policy. In rural areas, the traditional seven-day week continued to be used despite official disfavor. Several sources from the 1930s state that the old Gregorian calendar was not changed. Two modern sources explicitly state that the structure of the Gregorian calendar was not touched.

References 

Society of the Soviet Union
Obsolete calendars
1929 introductions
1929 establishments in the Soviet Union
1940 disestablishments in the Soviet Union